Troan is a hamlet in the parish of St Enoder, Cornwall, England, United Kingdom. It is north of Summercourt.

References

Hamlets in Cornwall